Palatine German may refer to:

 Palatine German language
 The Palatines, a people from the Palatinate

See also
Palatinate (region)
Palatinate (disambiguation)

Language and nationality disambiguation pages